Havsula is a mountain at Platenhalvøya in Prins Oscars Land at Nordaustlandet, Svalbard. It has a height of 415 m.a.s.l.

References

Mountains of Nordaustlandet